Laminacauda dentichelis is a species of sheet weaver found in Ecuador. It was described by Berland in 1913.

References

Linyphiidae
Invertebrates of Ecuador
Spiders of South America
Spiders described in 1913